Cottonwood Township, Nebraska may refer to the following places in Nebraska:

Cottonwood Township, Adams County, Nebraska
Cottonwood Township, Nance County, Nebraska
Cottonwood Township, Phelps County, Nebraska

See also
Cottonwood Township (disambiguation)

Nebraska township disambiguation pages